Alexander Ivanovich Pavlenko (born March 28, 1971), known as The Maniac Policeman, is a Russian rapist, murderer and suspected serial killer.

Biography 
Since August 1, 1992, Pavlenko worked as a junior investigator of the Leninsky District Department of Internal Affairs of Barnaul, later beginning to work as a driver for a medical center in the Oktyabrsky District Department of Internal Affairs. Since 1999, Pavlenko lured victims into his apartment, raping them and filming it for his porno album. Subsequently, the girls declared that he was obsessed with sexual sadism, and were afraid to tell the militsiya anything.

In 2000 Pavlenko nearly got caught, when a girl raped by him wrote an application to the police. His colleagues, defending the "honor of the uniform", did not stir up the case. Pavlenko also escaped dismissal and conviction because he gave the girl a bribe of 5000 rubles, and she took the application.

Refusing to turn in the killer, death soon followed. At the end of 2000, Pavlenko brutally dealt with two girls, whom he had taken to his apartment. After they refused his sexual advances, he struck them with a knife and then an axe, killing both of them. Pavlenko then dismembered their bodies in his own bathroom, packing the body parts in bags, putting them in the trunk of his car and disposing of them in the Ob River near the village of Gongba, where he loved to swim since childhood. Although the body parts were disposed of, they were soon discovered and quickly identified. In addition to the double murder, Pavlenko was charged with the murder of two other girls.

Arrest and trial 
Pavlenko was arrested after a victim of his jumped out the window, breaking her leg, and later gave a witness statement on the rape while in the hospital. In his apartment, a large amount of women's underwear, blood traces, hacksaws, knives, needles, tongs, handcuffs, axes, several albums and about 20 negative films with pornographic material were found during the search. After his detention, Pavlenko was questioned about other murders. Over the past summer in Barnaul, five abiturs of the Altai State Technical University had disappeared. Soon, on suspicion of committing the murders, a market trader named Alexander Anisimov was detained, who soon confessed to everything. However, Anisimov threw himself out the window during the investigative experiment, and the case remains opened. 

At his trial Pavlenko retracted all the previous testimonies, arguing that investigators of the prosecutor's office had beaten him into confessing. However, such a statement was refuted by the fact that after each interrogation he had undergone a medical examination. The Altai Regional Court sentenced former senior police sergeant Alexander Pavlenko to 24 years in prison on November 22, 2001, the first five of which he would serve in normal prison, and the rest in a strict-regime colony. The Supreme Court of Russia upheld the verdict without change.

Case aftermath 
Subsequently, the verdict was annulled by the Supreme Court of Russia on the recommendation of the European Court of Human Rights. On November 1, 2011, the Altai Regional Court issued a new conviction, to which Pavlenko was sentenced to 13 years imprisonment and 4 months. In January 2012, the Supreme Court of Russia again reversed the verdict and sent the criminal case for a new trial. On the charges of killing two girls and committing sexual acts against one of them, Pavlenko was acquitted. In connection to the case's revision, his sentence was reduced to 13 years and expired in February 2014.

In connection to the case of the "Maniac Policeman", which received a great public response in Barnaul, cleansing of the ranks of law enforcement agencies were carried out. Pavlenko was dismissed, but later the prosecutor of the Zheleznodorozhny District, Petr Gossen, was reinstated.

See also
 Barnaul Maniac
 List of Russian serial killers

In the media 
 Documentary film "Beauties and monsters" (second part) from the series "Criminal Russia" (2005)

References 

1971 births
Living people
People from Barnaul
Russian murderers of children
Russian rapists
Suspected serial killers